Shihu or Shi Hu may refer to:

People
Shi Hu (295–349, reigned 334–349), emperor of Later Zhao
Dānapāla (died 1017), Indian Buddhist monk in China, known as Shihu in Chinese
Shi Hu (artist) (born 1942)

Places in China
Shihu, Jilin, in Tonghua County, Jilin
Shihu, Lianshui County, Jiangsu
Shihu Township, Anhui, in Guzhen County, Bengbu, Anhui
Shihu Township, Jiangsu, in Donghai County, Lianyungang, Jiangsu
Lake Shi, fresh water lake in the southeast of Suzhou, Jiangsu

Transport
Shihu Moshe station in Wuzhong District, Suzhou, Jiangsu

See also
Hu Shih (1891–1962), Chinese scholar and politician
Sihu (disambiguation)
Xihu (disambiguation)